The Nora–Karlskoga Line is a railway line between Nora and Otterbäcken. 

The railway line officially opened in 1874 even though the Bofors–Strömtorp section had been in use since 1872.

References 

Railway lines in Sweden